Eric Nalder is an American investigative journalist based in Seattle, Washington. He has won two Pulitzer Prizes.

Nalder graduated from the University of Washington, with a B.A. in 1968.
He was senior enterprise reporter for Hearst Newspapers.

Nalder and three colleagues with The Seattle Times shared the National Reporting Pulitzer in 1990 for their "coverage of the Exxon Valdez oil spill and its aftermath". At the same time he was personally an Explanatory Journalism Pulitzer finalist for "a revealing series about oil-tanker safety and the failure of industry and government to adequately oversee the shipping of oil."

Nalder and two Seattle Times colleagues won the Investigative Reporting Pulitzer in 1997 for "their investigation of widespread corruption and inequities in the federally sponsored housing program for Native Americans, which inspired much-needed reforms."

Awards

2009 Excellence in Criminal Justice Reporting Awards
2008 George Polk Award
2001 Clarion Award Investigative Reporting
1997 Pulitzer Prize for Investigative Reporting
1996 “Excellence in Journalism” Investigative Reporting Award, by Society of Professional Journalists
1993 Goldsmith Prize
1990 Pulitzer Prize for National Reporting

Books
 Tankers Full of Trouble: the perilous journey of Alaskan crude (Grove Press, 1994), 
 Overwhelming Evidence: crime labs in crisis, Tomás Guillen, Eric Nalder, Seattle Times, 1995

References

External links
 "Loosening Lips: The Art of the Interview", Eric Nalder, Seattle Times
 "Breaking and Entering: How to dissect an organization", Eric Nalder, Seattle Times
 "Eric Nalder on 'Undue Influence'", Seattle Times
 

American male journalists
Pulitzer Prize for Investigative Reporting winners
Pulitzer Prize for National Reporting winners
George Polk Award recipients
University of Washington alumni
Living people
Year of birth missing (living people)
Place of birth missing (living people)